The Moscow Higher Combined Arms Command School "Supreme Soviet of the RSFSR" (abbreviated to MVOKU) is a higher military educational institution of the Russian Armed Forces.

History 

The school was formed in December 15, 1917 (O.S., December 28 N.S.), by order of Vladimir Lenin as the 1st Moscow revolutionary machine gun officers school. It later became the 1st Moscow Machine Gunners' Officers Course and "WPRA 1st Soviet Higher Military School All-Russian Central Executive Committee".  In 1938 it received the first of its three order medals, the Order of the Red Banner, as a result of its Corps of Cadets and some alumni of the school who fought the Battle of Khalkhin Gol. During the Second World War, on the Eastern Front, cadets and faculty at the school contributed to the defense of the Moscow Region and the city itself. Many of its cadets and alumni later received state medals and decorations (several were awarded posthumously). In October 1941, the school was granted the honorary title "Supreme Soviet of the RSFSR".

In October 1945, five months after the Allied victory in Europe and the command school's participation in the Moscow Victory Parade of 1945, it was moved to Kuzminki District in Moscow. This is its current location. In June 1958 the school was transformed into the Moscow Higher Combined Arms Command School. The school had a training period of four years. On May 7, 1965, the school was awarded the Order of Lenin. On February 21, 1978, the school was awarded the Order of the October Revolution. 

In 1995, the 4-year training period was lengthened to one of 5 years. In August 2004, the university was renamed as the Higher Professional Education Institution of the Ministry of Defense of the Russian Federation (and was retitled the Moscow Military Command Training School). In 2010, the school was integrated into the Combined Arms Academy of the Russian Armed Forces. In 2017, the Military Institute was removed from the Combined Arms Academy and was renamed again as the Moscow Higher Military Command School (Combined Arms). To mark its centennial year in 2017, the MHMCACS was awarded the Order of Zhukov. 

In January 1919 after a year of operations, the Red Army took over the school administration. The headquarters and campus were then at the Moscow Kremlin. During that period, in 1922 Vladimir Lenin was awarded as the young institution's first honorary cadet; he was later made its only honorary commandant. 

The Kremlin was its campus until 1935, when the school was moved to Moscow's Lefortovo District. At the Kremlin, the space was used by the Kremlin Regiment, now the President of Russia's escort and historical regiment. Mikhail Frunze told the cadets during a 1918 visit that the 1st SMHS and its Corps of Cadets "serves as the fighting vanguard and unfading hope of the proletariat revolution in the Russian Republic". Alumni of the school have served with the Soviet Army and the Russian Ground Forces in many local and international deployments.

Traditions
The school's cadets are also known as the Kremlin Cadets or the Kremlovtsy. In honor of its 1917 establishment and status as the oldest officer cadet school in Russia, since 1967 it has been the final school and military unit to mark the end of military parades in Moscow's Red Square. During the Moscow Victory Day Parade, members of the school also take part in the historical part. It also maintains privilege, granted in the 1920s, to hold graduation and commissioning parades there. From 1924 to 1935, the Corps of Cadets mounted guards of honour (No.1 Sentry) at Lenin's Mausoleum by orders of the All-Russian Central Executive Committee. In addition to Lenin, individuals honored as honorary cadets by the school were Mikhail Kalinin, Mikhail Frunze, Kliment Voroshilov, Nikolai Podvoisky, Sergey Kamenev, Avel Yenukidze, Georgy Chicherin, David Petrovsky, and Iona Yakir. 

The MVOKU Military Band is the premier musical unit of the academy. It is part of the Military Band Service of the Armed Forces of Russia under the Ministry of Defense. It performs at military ceremonies, the unveiling of monuments, and the annual Moscow Victory Day Parade.

Notable graduates
Pyotr Koshevoy, a Marshal of the Soviet Union who took part in the Crimean Offensive and the capture of Königsberg.
Sergey Biryuzov, Chief of the General Staff from 1963 to 1964.
Dmitry Yazov, the last Marshal of the Soviet Union to be appointed.
Colonel Ashot Hakobyan, Commander of the Honour Guard Company of the Ministry of Defense of Armenia from 1993–2005.
Vladimir Boldyrev, Commander-in-Chief of the Russian Ground Forces (2008-2010)
Mikhail Barsukov, head of the Federal Security Service (FSB) in mid-1990s.
Ruslan Khomchak, Commander-in-Chief of the Armed Forces of Ukraine (2019-2021)
Oleksandr Syrskyi, Commander Ukrainian Ground Forces (2019-)
Kadri Hazbiu, Minister of People's Defence of Albania in 1982.
Valery Sakhashchyk, Member of the United Transitional Cabinet for Defence and Security

Gallery

See also 
Military academy
Military academies in Russia

References 

Educational institutions established in 1917
Education and training establishments of the Soviet Army
Military command schools
1917 establishments in Russia